Frank Dufina (June 30, 1884 – August 11, 1972) was an American professional golfer of Chippewa descent in the early years of the sport in the United States.  

Dufina began his career in 1898 at the just-opened Wawashkamo Golf Club on Mackinac Island, Michigan, where he became the club professional. A member of the Mackinac Bands of Chippewa and Ottawa Indians, he was the first Native American to play golf on the professional circuit. Dufina played in the Western Open in 1911 and 1922. 

He continued to play and in 1968 was named as the "Longest Working Golf Professional in History" by Golf Digest. He counted many early golf professionals among his friends, including golf legend Walter Hagen. He, along with other notable golfers such as Arnold Palmer, served as a pallbearer at Hagen's funeral. Named for him, the Frank Dufina Match Play Championship is held annually at Wawashkamo Golf Club.

References

Further reading
Frank Straus, Brian Dunnigan: Walk a Crooked Trail. a Centennial History of Wawashkamo Golf Club (2000)

American male golfers
Golfers from Michigan
Native American sportspeople
Native American people from Michigan
People from Mackinac Island, Michigan
1884 births
1972 deaths